Reuben or Reuven (Standard Rəʾūven, Tiberian Rŭʾūḇēn) was the first of the six sons of Jacob and Leah (Jacob’s oldest son), according to the Book of Genesis. He was the founder of the Israelite Tribe of Reuben.

Etymology
The text of the Torah gives two different etymologies for the name of Reuben, which textual scholars attribute to different sources: one to the Yahwist and the other to the Elohist; the first explanation given by the Torah is that the name refers to God having witnessed Leah's misery, in regard to her status as the less-favourite of Jacob's wives, implying that the etymology of Reuben derives from raa beonyi, meaning he has seen my misery; the second explanation is that the name refers to Leah's hope that Reuben's birth will make Jacob love her, implying a derivation from yeehabani, meaning he will love me. Another Hebrew phrase to which Reuben is particularly close is ra'a ben, meaning behold, a son, which is how classical rabbinical literature interpreted it, although some of these sources argue that Leah was using the term to make an implied distinction between Reuben and Esau, his uncle. Some scholars suspect that the final consonant may originally have been an l (similar to an n in the early Hebrew alphabet), and Josephus rendered the name as Reubel; it is thus possible that Reuben's name is cognate with the Arabic term Ra'abil, meaning wolves.

Biblical references

In the Torah, Reuben is briefly described as having had sexual activity with Bilhah, his stepmother's maid and father's concubine. On his deathbed, Jacob declares that Reuben "will no longer excel, for you went up onto your father's bed, onto my couch and defiled it". Reuben's behaviour angered Jacob to the extent that he gave Reuben's birthright (as firstborn) to Joseph: a comment within  makes the same point. Classical rabbinical sources argue that the birthright had included the right of his descendants (the tribe of Reuben) to become ruler over the tribes (transferred to Judah) and priests (transferred to Levi). However, some of these sources argue that Reuben had not actually had sexual activity with Bilhah, but instead had simply supported the cause of his mother Leah, by harming that of Bilhah, angering Jacob; in these sources, it is argued that after the death of Rachel (Jacob's favourite wife), Jacob sought to give the precedence to Bilhah, as he had formerly preferred her as his mistress, and Reuben removed Bilhah's bed from the place where Jacob wished to have it. The classical rabbinical texts argue that Reuben immediately showed contrition for his actions in regard to Bilhah, and thus was the first penitent; initially, according to these sources, Reuben practiced penitence by secretly meditating, and also by abstaining from meat and wine, but when Judah confessed to the matter of Tamar, Reuben admitted what he had done, lest his other brothers might be suspected of his deed and punished for it. The classical sources go on to state that in honour of this voluntary penance and confession, God gave the tribe of Reuben Hosea as a member, and Reuben was given a reward in the future world.

Although part of the plot against Joseph, it is Reuben who persuades the others not to kill Joseph, tries to rescue him, and who later concludes that the trouble the brothers run into in Egypt was divine punishment for the plot. In classical rabbinical literature, Reuben is described as being motivated by a sense of responsibility over his brothers (since he was the eldest), and as having become angry when he discovers that Joseph had gone missing as a result of his brothers selling him to Ishmaelites (textual scholars attribute this version of the narrative to the Yahwist) or Joseph being found and taken by Midianites (textual scholars attribute this version of the narrative to the Elohist). The rabbinical sources argue that the first cities of refuge were located in the territory of the tribe of Reuben, since Reuben (the individual) had tried to save Joseph from the mob of his brothers.

Classical rabbinical sources argue that Reuben was born on 14 Kislev, and died at the age of 125. The midrashic Book of Jasher argues that when he died, Reuben's body was placed in a coffin, and was later taken back to Israel, where it was buried.

Reuben's family
The name(s) of his wife/wives are not given. According to the Book of Jasher, Chapter 45, Reuben's wife was Eliuram the daughter of Ewi the Canaanite (of Timnah).

Tomb 
There is a tradition that Reuben was buried at a shrine in the former village of Nabi Rubin; the site was a place of pilgrimage and an annual festival before the 1948 establishment of the State of Israel. The ruins of the shrine containing the Tomb of Reuben and those of an adjacent mosque, nowadays abandoned, are today part of the Palmachim National Park in Israel.

See also

Tribe of Reuben

References

External links

Founders of biblical tribes
Children of Jacob
1569 BC births
15th-century BC deaths
Tribe of Reuben
16th-century BC people